Magomed Guseinovich Kurbanov (born 8 February 1993) is a Russian freestyle wrestler. He won the silver medal in the men's 92 kg event at the 2021 World Wrestling Championships held in Oslo, Norway. In 2021, he also won the gold medal in the men's 92 kg event at the European Wrestling Championships held in Warsaw, Poland. He is also a three-time medalist at the Russian National Freestyle Wrestling Championships.

Major results

References

External links 
 

Living people
Place of birth missing (living people)
Russian male sport wrestlers
European Wrestling Championships medalists
World Wrestling Championships medalists
1993 births
European Wrestling Champions
Sportspeople from Dagestan
20th-century Russian people
21st-century Russian people